The Shkumbin (also  or ), also commonly Shkembi, is a river in Southern Europe.

Etymology 
It derives from Latin Scampinus, which replaced Illyrian Genusus, as recorded in Latin and ancient Greek literature. A Slavic intermediation has been rejected. Its inclusion in Latin loanwords into Proto-Albanian and phonetic evolution coincides with the historical existence of a large Roman town (near present-day Elbasan), which gave the river its new name.

Overview 
The river originates in the eastern Valamara Mountains between Maja e Valamarës and Gur i Topit in Southeastern Albania.
After descending from the Valamaras, it flows northwards through Proptisht and Qukës with many deep gorges and canyons and passes the Gora Mountains. A significant inflow comes from Gur i Kamjës southwest of Pogradec. Over the course, it flows inside a syncline between the Mokra and Shebenik Mountains in the east and the Polis Mountains in the west. Close to Librazhd the river turns some  westwards of its origin and joins the Rapun stream. At the end the river cross the Myzeqe Plain and forms a small delta in Karavasta Lagoon, the direct proximity of the Adriatic Sea.

Human history 
The ancient name of the river was Genusus and was located in central southern Illyria. At the same time, it was referred as Scampini, as it was identified by the town of Scampa. In classical antiquity, the valley of the Shkumbin was inhabited by several Illyrian peoples. The Parthini lived in the middle valley of the river. They neighbored to the west the Taulantii who lived in the coastal area including the lower valley of the river, and to the east the Dassaretii who lived in the region of Lake Ohrid, including the upper valley of the river. The ancient Via Egnatia followed the river, giving it the role of a strategically important corridor between orient and occident. The Via Egnatia started with two branches, the northern one from Epidamnos-Dyrrhachion, and the southern one from Apollonia. The two branches converged at Ad Quintum, near modern Elbasan, continuing eastwards through the valley of the Shkumbin.

In Roman Imperial times, the line of division between the administrative provinces of Illyricum and Epirus Nova ran from the west somewhere between Scodra and Dyrrachium, to the east somewhere between the north side of the Shkumbin and Lake Ohrid. During this period, the valley of Skumbin constituted roughly the border between the Latin and the Greek-speaking area.

The river is roughly the geographical dividing line between Tosk and Gheg Albanian dialects, with Gheg spoken north of the Shkumbin and Tosk south of it. The dialectal split occurred after Christianisation of the region (4th century AD), with the river as the historic dialectal boundary which straddled the Jireček line.

See also 
 
 Geography of Albania
 Central Mountain Range
 Rivers of Albania

References

Bibliography

Rivers of Albania
Geography of Korçë County
Geography of Elbasan County
Geography of Tirana County
Drainage basins of the Adriatic Sea
Braided rivers in Albania